Socorro Acioli was born in Fortaleza, Ceará in 1975. She is a journalist, has a master's degree in Brazilian literature and is currently following a PhD. in Literary Studies at the Universidade Federal Fluminense, Rio de Janeiro. She started her career in 2001 and since then has published books of various genres, such as biographies Frei Tito (2001) and Rachel de Queiroz (2003), children’s short stories and youth novels. In 2006, she was selected to take part in a workshop called ‘How to tell a tale’, conducted by the Nobel Prize Winner Gabriel Garcia Marquez at the San Antonio de Los Banõs International Film and Television School, Cuba. The author was selected by García Márquez himself based on the synopsis of the novel A cabeça do santo/The Head of the Saint, which was published in the UK in 2014 and in the US in 2016. In 2007, she was a visiting researcher at the International Youth Library in Munich, Germany. She has also given lectures in several countries such as Portugal, Bolivia and Cape Verde. Mrs. Accioli is also a translator, essayist and literary theory teacher.

Vende-se uma família/A Family for Sale (Biruta Publishing Company, 2007), her first youth novel, tells the story of the friendship between Álvaro, the son of the owner of the largest farm in Aquiraz, Ceará and Benício, a slave from the farm. They become friends in their early childhood and are separated after Maria Luanda, Benicio’s mother, is sold. According to Fernanda Coutinho, teacher and literary critic, it is a narration that "flows quickly, following the steps of the brothers until adulthood, maintaining continuously aroused the curiosity of the reader about what is to come and, at the same time, makes them look through a portrait of the Brazilian family through the conjunction of customs of the three races that gave origin to it. The leaves of the album transcribe African and indigenous rituals such as the arts of healing, the belief in the magic power of the herbs, the singing and dancing, as expressions of joy and consolation, funeral ceremonies, rituals of listening and storytelling as sources of spiritual nourishment".

The novel A bailarina fantasma (Biruta Publishing Company, 2010), according to the literary critic, Marisa Lajolo, is a masterpiece, for all ages, with no contraindication. As in every good novel, in Anabela’s story truth and imagination, fact and fiction interweave with such subtlety, that the reader hardly realizes when one starts and the other finishes. 

Inventário de Segredos/Inventory of Secrets (Biruta Publishing Company, 2010), a string literature youth novel, tells the story of a town through the revealing of the main secrets of its inhabitants. According to the writer Marina Colassanti, "the connection with string literature is great, the narrative chain works very well, and the erotic/loving theme is handled with the humor that the genre requires."

Head of the Saint (Hot Key Books, 2014) is her first English-language novel for young people, translated by Daniel Hahn.

Bibliography

Awards

 Melhor Obra Inédita de Literatura Infantil - Secretaria de Cultura do Estado do Ceará 2005
 Selo Altamente Recomendável - FNLIJ 2006, 2007 e 2008

References

External links

Author's Facebook
Watch the A Bailarina Fantasma (The Phantom Ballerina) booktrailer
Author's Blog
Jornal O POVO
Diário do Nordeste

1975 births
Living people
Brazilian women writers
Brazilian women journalists
Brazilian speculative fiction writers
Brazilian children's writers